Ab Mal (also Romanized as Āb Māl) is a village in Khangiran Rural District, in the Central District of Sarakhs County, Razavi Khorasan Province, Iran. At the 2006 census, its population was 629, in 130 families.

References 

Populated places in Sarakhs County